Genioliparis is a genus of snailfishes.

Species
There are currently three recognized species in this genus:
 Genioliparis ferox (Stein, 1978)
 Genioliparis kafanovi Balushkin & Voskoboinikova, 2008
 Genioliparis lindbergi Andriashev & Neyelov, 1976

References

Liparidae
Taxa named by Anatoly Andriyashev
Taxa named by Alexei Vladimovich Neyelov
Fish described in 1976